Ratlines are lengths of thin line tied between the shrouds of a sailing ship to form a ladder. Found on all square-rigged ships, whose crews must go aloft to stow the square sails, they also appear on larger fore-and-aft rigged vessels to aid in repairs aloft or conduct a lookout from above.

Rat-boards
Rat-boards are lower courses in a ratline, often made of slats of wood (battens) for support where the distance between shrouds is greatest. In some instances holes in these slats guide and organise low-tension lines between the deck and the rig.

Knotting

See also 
 Footrope

References 

Sailing rigs and rigging